Bernardo Saracino is an American actor. He is a native of New Mexico.

Filmography

Film

Television

References

External links

Living people
American male film actors
American male television actors
Year of birth missing (living people)
Male actors from New Mexico